The 2014 Supercheap Auto Bathurst 1000 was an Australian touring car race for V8 Supercars, the thirtieth race of the 2014 International V8 Supercars Championship, held on 12 October 2014 at the Mount Panorama Circuit on the outskirts of Bathurst, New South Wales.

The race was won by Ford Performance Racing of Chaz Mostert and Paul Morris, ahead of Nissan Motorsport's James Moffat and Taz Douglas, and the James Rosenberg Racing pair Nick Percat and Oliver Gavin. 2014 marked the longest running in the race's history, just shy of eight hours, and the first time the race has been won by a combination that started last. This race is considered by critics and fans to be one of the best in the history of the event and regarded by some to be the greatest motor race of all time, with weird and unprecedented events, as well as Mostert's last lap pass on series champion Jamie Whincup - who ran out of fuel when entering Conrod Straight - adding to the excitement of the event.

Background
The 2014 race was the eighteenth running of the Australian 1000 race, which was first held after the organisational split between the Australian Racing Drivers Club and V8 Supercars Australia that saw two "Bathurst 1000" races contested in both 1997 and 1998. The 2014 race was also the 57th race for which the lineage can be traced back to the 1960 Armstrong 500 – held at Phillip Island – and the 54th to be held at Mount Panorama.

Volvo made its first appearance in a major endurance race at Bathurst since the factory supported Volvo Dealer Racing finished second and third in the 1999 Bob Jane T-Marts 500 with a pair of Volvo S40s. Garry Rogers Motorsport ran Volvo S60s under the banner of Volvo Polestar Racing.

In addition to the twenty five regular championship entries, two wildcard entries were accepted for the 2014 race. Of the two, the Dragon Motor Racing entry subsequently withdrew, leaving only the Ford FG Falcon entered by Super Black Racing. The team featured much New Zealand symbology, similar to Team Kiwi Racing, although the only connection was some team personnel, notably drivers Andre Heimgartner and Ant Pedersen who had both previously driven with Team Kiwi Racing. Prior to 2020, the 26-car field equalled the 1961 edition as the smallest entry list in Bathurst 1000 history.

Mark Winterbottom and Steven Richards were the defending race winners, but were not racing together in 2014 as Winterbottom was paired with Steve Owen at Ford Performance Racing, whilst Richards teamed up with Craig Lowndes at Triple Eight Race Engineering.

Entry list

Entries with a grey background were wildcard entries which did not compete in the full championship season.

Report

Free Practice
The first free practice session took place on the Thursday morning prior to the race with a duration of fifty minutes. The session was open to both championship drivers and co-drivers, with Chaz Mostert setting the fastest time ahead of James Moffat and Garth Tander. David Wall suffered a tyre failure on Conrod Straight, causing him to make contact with the wall and damaging the front and rear of the car. Cameron Waters hit the wall at the Cutting, damaging the rear of his car. Both cars would miss the second free practice session, which was only for co-drivers. Four-time Bathurst winner Greg Murphy topped the session in his Holden Racing Team Commodore over the defending Bathurst winner Steven Richards and Brad Jones Racing's Luke Youlden. The third practice session took place mid-afternoon and was littered with red flags, first for Robert Dahlgren and then Tander, who both had accidents at the Dipper. The session was restarted five minutes from the end and the top three cars all broke the practice lap record (2:06.8012, set by Craig Lowndes in 2010) in that time: David Reynolds set a 2:06.3714, Mark Winterbottom a 2:06.4813 and Fabian Coulthard a 2:06.5463.

Ford Performance Racing topped both free practice sessions on Friday, with Steve Owen going fastest in the co-driver only session ahead of Youlden and Alexandre Prémat. After repairing Wall's car on Thursday, Dick Johnson Racing had more work to do after Ashley Walsh crashed the team's other car in an incident similar to that of Waters the day before. In the fifth free practice session, Winterbottom became the first driver to set a lap time under 2:06 with a time of 2:05.9011, ahead of Scott McLaughlin and Jamie Whincup, who both set a time of 2:06.1.

Summary

Qualifying

Top 10 Shootout

Race 
Whincup began with one of the best starts in the events history, starting 25th and leading the race by lap 22, after a tactical play by Red Bull engineer Mark Dutton to have him start the race against the co-drivers, giving the car to his co-driver Dumbrell with a lap long lead. 

Lap 45, Luke Youlden hit a kangaroo at 200 km/h that jumped on the track, hitting the driver's side door that left the car damaged, to the point that the door could not be opened. Youlden's incident with the kangaroo bought out the safety car as a precaution, checking that there were not any more kangaroos near the track, whilst also removing the dead kangaroo from the track. Unfortunately for Brad Jones Racing it was not the only incident that occurred during the lap, with Dale Wood ignoring the safety car yellow and running into the back of the third BJR car, driven by Jason Bright, ruling both cars out of the race.  This left Coulthard/Youlden as the only BJR car still in the race.

After resurfacing the track prior to the race, the road at Griffins Bend began to open up, with three crashes being caused. Race direction ordered a red flag to fix the track surface, making it safe to drive through the corner. It was the first time in the history of the race that a red flag did not end the race, as not enough laps had been run to determine a winner, with teams joking about supplying 'half-time' oranges to the teams. Whincup revealed in 2018 he fell asleep in the Red Bull motorhome during the stoppage, being asleep for an hour and a half before a team member woke him up to start again. Controversy was ridden throughout the stoppage, as teams who had damage to their cars were allowed to fix and repair, despite it being in the rules, many of the leading teams called it an unfair advantage, which would affect the race's final result.

Driving the same car that was damaged in the Sandown 500 two weeks prior, Holdsworth was again totalled by circumstances out of his control, as Ingall tried to pass Todd Kelly he unintentionally tagged Holdsworth with the car rolling onto its roof. 

By 4pm, the safety car nearly had to be deployed when a kid's rugby league football somehow made its way onto Conrod Straight, luckily an official was able to run onto the track and retrieve the ball while there were no cars near the area of the track. 

Within the last hour, Van Gisbergen had built a large lead over the rest of the field, going in for one last pit stop before finishing the end of the race, when the car turned off and would not start up in the pits.

By the last hour of the race, four cars from two different teams emerged as the leading pack, with Whincup and Lowndes from Red Bull Racing and Winterbottom and Mostert from Ford Performance Racing. After Lowndes was given a drive-through penalty for spinning Winterbottom, it left Whincup and Mostert at the lead of the race, with Whincup dangerously low on fuel and Mostert behind him by over two seconds. Despite his team warning him to conserve fuel, Whincup chose to ignore team orders, continuing to push on until two laps to go when it became apparent that he was not going to make it, while Mostert was still two seconds behind by the middle of the lap 160 was told by his team to stop conserving and catch Whincup, lapping two seconds quicker as a result.  When passing Griffens Bend on the final lap, Mostert squeezed Whincup's lead to 0.289 seconds. Mostert attempted to pass Whincup at Skyline, however Whincup took the racing line leading to the two nearly tagging each other, with Mostert pulling back at the Dipper waiting for another attempt at Forrests Elbow. Mostert tricked Whincup, performing a criss-cross move that allowed him to pass on the inside racing line, blistering ahead on Conrod Straight as Whincup ran out of fuel at the same time as Mostert's pass. During this time Moffat, then in third place was able to pass Whincup at The Chase, while Mostert drove to an unprecedented victory, only leading one lap during the race and executing the first last lap pass in the events history. To add to his disappointment, Whincup was also passed by Percat after The Chase and Will Davison on the front straight, finishing fifth as a result.

In an unprecedented moment, the first and second placed cars had both crashed during the race, all ironically at Griffins Bend, with the Mostert/Morris car came as a result of the track breakup, while the Moffat/Douglas car crashed once because of the track breakup and once in a collision with Jack Perkins. This made the Percat/Gavin car the rare honour of being the only podium finishing car that did not have any damage by race end.

Classification

Qualifying

Notes:
 – The car of Garth Tander and Warren Luff was heavily damaged in a crash in the sixth free practice session, held on Saturday morning, which led to the car being withdrawn from the top ten shootout and the race. As a result, all cars which did not qualify for the top ten shootout were moved up one position on the starting grid.
 – David Reynolds and Jamie Whincup both crashed and caused a red flag during the qualifying session, which led to their fastest lap times being invalidated.
 – Chaz Mostert originally qualified fourteenth but was excluded from the session for passing under red flags.

Top 10 Shootout
Only nine cars took part in the top ten shootout after Garth Tander's car was heavily damaged in a crash in practice on Saturday morning. Eleventh-fastest qualifier James Courtney was originally promoted to take part of in the top ten shootout, but was later prevented from running after a protest from Triple Eight Race Engineering.

Starting grid
The following table represents the final starting grid for the race on Sunday:

Race

References

Supercheap Auto Bathurst 1000
Motorsport in Bathurst, New South Wales